Daniel Waters may refer to:

 Daniel Waters (minuteman) (1731–1816), officer in the Continental Navy and the United States Navy
 Daniel Waters (novelist) (born 1969), American author of young adult novels
 Daniel Waters (screenwriter) (born 1962), American screenwriter and film director
 Dan Waters, politician in Ontario, Canada

See also
Daniel Walters (disambiguation)
Daniel Watters (born 1971), American swimmer